George Seaton (April 17, 1911 – July 28, 1979) was an American screenwriter, playwright, film director and producer, and theatre director.

Life and career

Early life
Seaton was born George Edward Stenius in South Bend, Indiana, of Swedish descent, the son of Olga (Berglund) and Charles Stenius, who was a chef and restaurant manager. He was baptized as Roman Catholic. He grew up in a Detroit Jewish neighborhood, and described himself as a "Shabas goy". So he went on to learn Hebrew in an Orthodox Jewish Yeshiva and was even bar mitzvahed. He attended Exeter and was meant to go to Yale but instead auditioned for Jesse Bonstelle's drama school in Detroit. She hired him for her stock company at $15 a week.

Actor
Seaton worked in stock and on radio. He worked as an actor on radio station WXYZ. John L. Barrett played the Lone Ranger on test broadcasts of the series in early January 1933, but when the program became part of the regular schedule Seaton was cast in the title role. In later years, he claimed to have devised the cry "Hi-yo, Silver" because he couldn't whistle for his horse as the script required.

Seaton also wrote several plays, one of which was read by an executive at MGM who offered him a contract.

Writer at MGM
Seaton, along with fellow writer and friend Robert Pirosh, joined Metro-Goldwyn-Mayer as a contract writer in 1933.

He was credited on the scripts for Student Tour (1934) and The Winning Ticket (1935) and did some uncredited work with Robert Pirosh on A Night at the Opera (1935).

Seaton's first major screen credit was the Marx Brothers comedy A Day at the Races (1937). He left MGM in 1937, unhappy at being restricted to comedies.

He did some uncredited work on the script for Stage Door (1937) and The Wizard of Oz (1939). He wrote a play But Not Goodbye.

Columbia
Seaton went to Columbia where he was credited on the scripts for The Doctor Takes a Wife (1940), This Thing Called Love (1940) and Bedtime Story (1941). At Columbia Seaton first met William Perlberg.

20th Century Fox
In the early 1940s, he joined 20th Century Fox, where he remained for the rest of the decade, writing scripts for That Night in Rio (1941) with Don Ameche and Alice Faye. For a time he specialised in musicals and comedy: Moon Over Miami (1941), with Betty Grable and Ameche, and Charley's Aunt (1941), with Jack Benny.

Seaton wrote a historical war film, Ten Gentlemen from West Point (1942), then did the comedies The Magnificent Dope (1942) with Ameche and Henry Fonda, and The Meanest Man in the World (1943) with Jack Benny.

Seaton wrote The Song of Bernadette (1943) which was a big success. It was produced by William Perlberg who would have an important influence on Seaton's career.

Seaton followed it with the Betty Grable musical Coney Island (1943). He also wrote The Eve of St. Mark (1944).

But Not Goodbye, Seaton's 1944 Broadway debut as a playwright, closed after only 23 performances, although it later was adapted for the 1946 MGM film The Cockeyed Miracle by Karen DeWolf.

Director
Seaton had been so successful as a writer he was able to turn director. His first film was Diamond Horseshoe (1945) with Grable, which he also wrote. It was produced by William Perlberg, who would go on to produce all of Seaton's films from this time on. The film was very successful.

Seaton did some uncredited directing on Where Do We Go from Here? (1945) then wrote and directed Junior Miss (1945), based on a popular play, with Peggy Ann Garner.

Seaton wrote and directed The Shocking Miss Pilgrim (1947) with Grable.

He followed it with Miracle on 34th Street (1947), which quickly became acknowledged as a classic. Seaton won an Oscar for his screenplay.

Seaton wrote and directed two comedies, Apartment for Peggy (1948) with William Holden and Jeanne Crain, and Chicken Every Sunday (1949) with Dan Dailey.

He did a drama about the Berlin Airlift with Montgomery Clift, The Big Lift (1950), then did another comedy, For Heaven's Sake (1950), with Clifton Webb.

Perlberg-Seaton Productions
In November 1950 Seaton and Perlberg signed a multi-million-dollar contract with Paramount for six years. Seaton would write and direct films, and they would also produce films from others.

They produced, but did not write or direct, the comedy Rhubarb (1951), Aaron Slick from Punkin Crick (1952), and Somebody Loves Me (1952) with Betty Hutton.

Seaton's first film as writer director for Paramount was Anything Can Happen (1952), a comedy with José Ferrer.

Seaton made two films with Bing Crosby. Little Boy Lost (1953) was not a success but The Country Girl (1954), based on the play by Clifford Odets was a notable triumph. Grace Kelly earned an Oscar for Best Actress and Seaton won an Oscar for his screenplay.

Seaton and Perlberg The Bridges at Toko-Ri (1954), directed by Mark Robson, with Holden and Kelly. It was a huge hit.

In 1955 Seaton was elected president of the Academy of Motion Picture Arts and Sciences. He would serve three terms.

Seaton directed the 28th Academy Awards in 1956.

Seaton wrote and directed The Proud and Profane (1956) with William Holden and Deborah Kerr, which was a box office disappointment. He directed a short film Williamsburg: The Story of a Patriot (1957) and produced The Tin Star (1957), directed by Anthony Mann.

Seaton and Perlberg were borrowed by MGM to direct and produce a comedy with Clark Gable and Doris Day, Teacher's Pet (1958). He did not write.

In April 1958 Seaton announced he and Perlberg would produce six more films for Paramount. The first of these were But Not for Me (1959) and The Rat Race (1960), directed by Robert Mulligan.

Seaton worked as director only on The Pleasure of His Company (1961) with Fred Astaire and Debbie Reynolds.

He wrote and directed The Counterfeit Traitor (1962) with Holden. They ended to follow it with The Hook then Night Without End adapted by Eric Ambler from an Alistair MacLean novel.

MGM
Perlberg-Seaton Productions moved to MGM where Seaton directed Kirk Douglas in The Hook (1963) a Korean War drama.

He was uncredited producer on Twilight of Honor (1963) and directed some additional scenes on Mutiny on the Bounty (1963).

Seaton announced he would make Merrily We Roll Along but the film was never made.

Seaton wrote and directed 36 Hours (1964), a war time thriller based on a story by Roald Dahl.

Broadway
In May 1965 Seaton announced the end of his partnership with Perlberg. He returned to Broadway to direct Above William. (1965)

He then directed the Norman Krasna play Love in E Flat, which was a critical and commercial flop. The musical Here's Love, adapted from his screenplay for Miracle on 34th Street by Meredith Willson, proved to be more successful.

Universal
Seaton went to Universal where he signed a three-picture contract. The first film was the comedy What's So Bad About Feeling Good? (1968) which Seaton produced and directed as well as writing with Robert Pirosh, with whom he had cowritten A Day at the Races (1937). Seaton disliked writing, producing and directing. "It's too much work," he said.

Seaton then had the biggest hit of his career with the all-star Airport (1970), which Seaton adapted from the novel by Arthur Hailey. It was produced by Ross Hunter. Seaton's script earned him an Oscar nomination.

Seaton's last film as director was his third for Universal Showdown (1973), which he also produced. He announced he was looking for another film to make but none eventuated.

Seaton died of cancer in Beverly Hills, California in 1979. He had been suffering from it for two years.

Partial filmography

 A Day at the Races (1937)
 The Doctor Takes a Wife (1940) (writer)
 Bedtime Story (1941) (writer only)
 The Song of Bernadette (1943)
 The Meanest Man in the World (1943)
 Junior Miss (1945)
 The Shocking Miss Pilgrim (1947)
 Miracle on 34th Street (1947)
 Apartment for Peggy (1948)
 Chicken Every Sunday (1949)
 The Big Lift (1950)
 For Heaven's Sake (1950)
 Anything Can Happen (1952)
 Little Boy Lost (1953)
 The Country Girl (1954)
 The Proud and Profane (1956)
 Williamsburg: the Story of a Patriot (1957)
 Teacher's Pet (1958)
 The Pleasure of His Company (1961)
 The Counterfeit Traitor (1962)
 The Hook (1963)
 36 Hours (1964)
 What's So Bad About Feeling Good? (1968)
 Airport (1970)
 Showdown (1973)

References

External links
 
George Seaton Papers at the Wisconsin Center for Film and Theater Research.

1911 births
1979 deaths
American theatre directors
Best Adapted Screenplay Academy Award winners
Presidents of the Academy of Motion Picture Arts and Sciences
Writers from South Bend, Indiana
Lone Ranger
Deaths from cancer in California
20th-century American dramatists and playwrights
Jean Hersholt Humanitarian Award winners
American people of Swedish descent
Film directors from Indiana
20th-century screenwriters